Khmelevo is a rural locality (a village) in Kiprevskoye Rural Settlement, Kirzhachsky District, Vladimir Oblast, Russia. The population was 67 as of 2010. There are 3 streets.

Geography 
Khmelevo is located 25 km southeast of Kirzhach (the district's administrative centre) by road. Novinki is the nearest rural locality.

References 

Rural localities in Kirzhachsky District